Streptomyces catenulae is a bacterium species from the genus of Streptomyces. Streptomyces catenulae produces paromomycin, catenulin, N-isobutyrylpepstatin neomycin E, neomycin F, 2-amini-3-butynoic acid, and pepsinostreptin.

Further reading

See also 
 List of Streptomyces species

References

External links
Type strain of Streptomyces catenulae at BacDive -  the Bacterial Diversity Metadatabase

catenulae
Bacteria described in 1961